BSC Young Boys is a Swiss football club, based in Bern. They first competed in a UEFA competition in 1957, qualifying for the European Cup after winning the 1956–57 Swiss League. The furthest they have progressed in a UEFA tournament is the semi-finals of the 1958–59 European Cup, where they were beaten by Reims.

European results & record

By competition 

Source: UEFA.com, Last updated on 23 November 2021.

Pld = Matches played; W = Matches won; D = Matches drawn; L = Matches lost; GF = Goals for; GA = Goals against. Defunct competitions indicated in italics.

References 

BSC Young Boys
Swiss football clubs in international competitions